The Prime Minister's Resignation Honours in the United Kingdom are honours granted at the behest of an outgoing prime minister following their resignation. In such a list, a prime minister may ask the monarch to bestow peerages, or lesser honours, on any number of people of their choosing. In 1997, an additional 47 working peers were created at the behest of the three main parties.

History
Since May 2007, the House of Lords Appointments Commission has had to approve proposed peerages, while oversight by the Honours Committee within the Cabinet Office ensures that other honours are appropriate. Some previous lists had attracted criticism. Former Prime Minister Tony Blair did not issue a list by June 2007, apparently because of the "Cash for Honours scandal". Gordon Brown did not publish a resignation honours list either, but a dissolution list was issued on his advice (to similar effect).

David Cameron revived the practice in his Resignation Honours published in August 2016, following his resignation a month earlier. Some names on the list were leaked to the press several days in advance. A number of proposed recipients were reportedly blocked on ethical grounds. His successor, Theresa May, followed suit in September 2019.

Criticism

Resignation honours have been denounced by some as an example of cronyism. The 1976 resignation honours of Harold Wilson—which became known as the "Lavender List"—had caused controversy as a number of recipients were wealthy businessmen whose principles were considered antithetic to those held by the Labour Party at the time. David Cameron's list was described as a "who's who of failed Remainers". Theresa May's list was criticized with SNP MP Pete Wishart likening it to "handing out peerages like sweeties to the same Tory advisers who got us into this Brexit mess".

References

 
Politics of the United Kingdom
Resignation